This is a list of notable Mount Everest guides, which are professional mountaineers (and mountaineering firms) who help people to ascend Mount Everest in the Himalayas in return for fees. Previously, the summit was only accessible to expert mountaineers who were often self-guided, or assisted by local sherpas.

Role
Guides can, for example, set fixed lines of rope for others to use, organize rescues in times of trouble, or use communication tools to call in helicopter evacuations. Another job on Mount Everest is as an "icefall doctor" using ladders and ropes to make a path across the Khumbu Icefall, which guides might do themselves or delegate to others. Guides, especially if they are guiding for a mountaineering or adventure company, often call the people they help up "clients".

Another task on Everest is helping people with medical problems, although the work can be dangerous. When potentially deadly health conditions strike, the guides can sometimes lose their clients or abort the climb. One mother of two died after developing a health problem at the Everest base camp.

Mount Everest guides assist climbers on what are called "guided" climbs, and guided ascent can cost double an unguided one. Many climbers in more recent times are unguided but can get some support from a Sherpa, which, though more similar to an Alpinist porter, is much cheaper and also called a guide. The term guide can mean something along the lines of an assistant all the way to a World-famous mountaineer.

Notable guides

Adrian Ballinger
Andy Harris
Andy Tyson
Anatoli Boukreev
Andrew Lock
Arnold Coster
Bill Allen
Dan Nash
Daniel Mazur
Dave Hahn
David Breashears
David Hamilton
David Morton
Jacob Schmitz
Dean Staples
Eric Simonson
Garrett Madison
Gheorghe Dijmărescu
Kenton Cool
Lydia Bradey
Mike Hamill
Mark Whetu
Mark Woodward
Michael Horst
Michael Groom
Mike Roberts
Neal Beidleman
Phil Crampton
Phil Ershler
Rob Hall 
Russell Brice
Scott Fischer
Vernon Tejas
Wally Berg
Ryan Waters
Willie Benegas

Notable Nepali guides

Ang Rita (Angrita Sherpa)
Ang Dorje Sherpa
Ang Tharkay
Apa Sherpa
Babu Chiri Sherpa
Kami Rita Sherpa 
Lakpa Gelu
Lopsang Jangbu Sherpa
Nawang Gombu
Pem Dorjee Sherpa
Pertemba (Pertemba Sherpa)
Phurba Tashi
Sungdare Sherpa
Temba Tsheri
Tashi Tenzing
Tenzing Norgay
Tyler Daigle

Notable firms

Adventure Consultants
Asian Trekking
Himex (Himalayan Experience)
Jagged Globe
Mountain Madness

See also
List of summiters of Mount Everest
List of people who died climbing Mount Everest
Nepal Mountaineering Association

References

External links
Alan's page on guides

Mount Everest
Climbing and mountaineering-related lists
Mountaineering in Asia